The Wonderful Day (French: Une merveilleuse journée) is a 1980 French comedy film directed by Claude Vital and starring Michel Galabru, Daniel Ceccaldi and Stéphane Hillel.

Cast

References

Bibliography 
 James Monaco. The Encyclopedia of Film. Perigee Books, 1991.

External links 
 

1980 films
1980 comedy films
French comedy films
1980s French-language films
Remakes of French films
French films based on plays
Films scored by Claude Bolling
Films directed by Claude Vital
1980s French films